Angelo Ralph Mollis (born May 24, 1961) is an American politician who served as the Secretary of State of Rhode Island from 2007 to 2015. A member of the Democratic Party, he assumed office on January 1, 2007. He was reelected to a second term beginning January 4, 2011 and was succeeded by fellow Democrat Nellie Gorbea on January 6, 2015.

Career
Mollis attended St. Anselm College and the Southern New England School of Law, but he left law school to pursue a career in finance with LAMCO Pension and Investment Advisory Firm, simultaneously serving as Town Councilman of North Providence from 1986 until 1996.  Mollis rose to Vice President/Director of Office Operations of LAMCO.

Mollis served as Town Council President in 1993 and 1994 and became mayor of North Providence in January 1997. He was re-elected in 2000 and 2004, In 2006, he was elected Secretary of State. In 2010, voters gave him a second four-year term. As secretary of state, Mollis has pushed various electoral reforms.  While he served as the state's chief elections official, Rhode Island broke records for the number of registered voters as well as primary and general election turnout. By law, the Secretary of State also has a number of business-related duties. To make it easier for businesses to meet their state-mandated reporting requirements, Mollis introduced on-line filing of documents such as annual reports. Working with the state's Economic Development Corporation, Mollis rolled out a "We Mean Business" initiative to help start-up and emerging companies get fast answers from government agencies. In his role overseeing the State Archives, Mollis introduces students to state history by bringing historic documents such as Rhode Island's version of the Emancipation Proclamation to schools all over Rhode Island.

Mollis was prevented from running for reelection as Secretary of State in the 2014 elections by term limits. He ran for Lieutenant Governor of Rhode Island, but lost the Democratic Party's nomination to Daniel McKee. In 2017, Mollis was hired as the town manager for North Kingstown, Rhode Island.

References

External links 
 Secretary of State biography
Guide to the Secretary of State A. Ralph Mollis records from the Rhode Island State Archives
Voters First Advisory Commission 2008 Recommendations from the Rhode Island State Archives

Living people
1961 births
Secretaries of State of Rhode Island
Mayors of places in Rhode Island
Rhode Island Democrats
People from North Providence, Rhode Island
Saint Anselm College alumni